Giullia Rodrigues Penalber de Oliveira (born 13 April 1992) is a Brazilian freestyle wrestler. She is the gold medalist in the women's 57kg event at the 2018 South American Games. She is also a two-time gold medalist in this event at the Pan American Wrestling Championships.

Career 

She competed in the 55kg event at the 2014 World Wrestling Championships held in Tashkent, Uzbekistan where she reached the quarterfinals. The following year, she competed in the 53kg event where she was eliminated in her first match by Lilya Horishna of Ukraine. In 2018, she competed in the 57kg event where she was eliminated in her second match by Grace Bullen of Norway. In 2019, she reached the quarterfinals in the 57kg event.

She competed at the Pan American Games both in 2015 and in 2019. In 2015, she represented Brazil without winning a medal and, at the 2019 Pan American Games in Lima, Peru, she won one of the bronze medals in the 57kg event.

In 2018, she won the gold medal in the 57kg event at the South American Games held in Cochabamba, Bolivia.

At the 2020 Pan American Wrestling Championships held in Ottawa, Canada, she won the gold medal in the 57kg event. She also competed in the 2020 Pan American Wrestling Olympic Qualification Tournament, also held in Ottawa, Canada, without qualifying for the 2020 Summer Olympics in Tokyo, Japan. She won one match and lost two matches and she did not advance to the semi-finals.

In March 2021, she won the gold medal in the 57kg event at the Matteo Pellicone Ranking Series 2021 held in Rome, Italy. She won the silver medal in her event at the 2021 Dan Kolov & Nikola Petrov Tournament held in Plovdiv, Bulgaria. In May 2021, she failed to qualify for the Olympics at the World Olympic Qualification Tournament held in Sofia, Bulgaria. She won her first two matches but she then lost her match in the semi-finals against Mathilde Rivière of France. At the end of that same month, she won the gold medal in the women's 57kg event at the 2021 Pan American Wrestling Championships held in Guatemala City, Guatemala. In October 2021, she was eliminated in her second match in the women's 57kg event at the World Wrestling Championships in Oslo, Norway.

In 2022, she competed in the 57kg event at the Yasar Dogu Tournament held in Istanbul, Turkey. She won one of the bronze medals in her event at the 2022 Pan American Wrestling Championships held in Acapulco, Mexico.

A month later, she also won one of the bronze medals in her event at the Matteo Pellicone Ranking Series 2022 held in Rome, Italy. She won the gold medal in her event at the 2022 Tunis Ranking Series event held in Tunis, Tunisia.

She was eliminated in her first match in the 57kg event at the 2022 World Wrestling Championships held in Belgrade, Serbia. She won the silver medal in her event at the 2022 South American Games held in Asunción, Paraguay.

Personal life 

Judoka Victor Penalber is her brother. Before switching to wrestling, she also competed in judo and she won medals at several events, including the 2009 Pan American U20 Championships and the 2012 Brazilian U23 Championships.

Achievements

References

External links 

 

Living people
1992 births
Place of birth missing (living people)
Brazilian female judoka
Brazilian female sport wrestlers
Pan American Games medalists in wrestling
Pan American Games bronze medalists for Brazil
Medalists at the 2019 Pan American Games
Wrestlers at the 2015 Pan American Games
Wrestlers at the 2019 Pan American Games
South American Games gold medalists for Brazil
South American Games silver medalists for Brazil
South American Games medalists in wrestling
Competitors at the 2018 South American Games
Competitors at the 2022 South American Games
Pan American Wrestling Championships medalists
21st-century Brazilian women